J11 may refer to:

Vehicles

Aircraft 
 Fiat J 11, an Italian sesquiplane fighter in service with the Swedish Air Force
 Junkers J 11, a German ground-attack aircraft
 Shenyang J-11, a Chinese jet fighter

Automobiles 
 James Comet J11, an English motorcycle
 Nissan Qashqai J11, a Japanese SUV

Locomotives 
 GSR Class J11, an Irish steam locomotive
 LNER Class J11, a class of British steam locomotives

Ships 
 , a Halcyon-class minesweeper of the Royal Navy
 , a Visby-class destroyer of the Swedish Navy

Other uses 
 County Route J11 (California)
 DEC J-11, a microprocessor chip set
 Gyroelongated pentagonal pyramid, a Johnson solid (J11)

See also 
 JII (disambiguation)